South Dakota-class battleship may refer to either of two battleship classes of the United States Navy:

 , a class of six ships authorized but never completed
 , a class of four ships which saw service in World War II

See also
 South Dakota (disambiguation)